Carlos Alberto de Toro (born 11 December 1963), is a former Argentine football player and manager.

External links
 https://web.archive.org/web/20140407060405/http://deportes.vivenicaragua.com/target-goal/2008/01/10/%E2%80%9Cgood-bye%E2%80%9D-carlos-de-toro.html
 https://archive.today/20150725014556/http://barracacique.com/13-directores-tecnicos-han-pasado-durante-la-sequia
 https://www.ceroacero.es/coach.php?id=6737

1960 births
Living people
Argentine football managers
C.D. Águila managers
Comunicaciones F.C. managers
Puntarenas F.C. managers
Diriangén F.C. managers
Platense F.C. managers
Nicaragua national football team managers
Expatriate football managers in Guatemala
Expatriate football managers in Costa Rica
Expatriate football managers in El Salvador
Expatriate football managers in Honduras
Expatriate football managers in Nicaragua